Herbert Jack Forsey (November 17, 1913 – January 1, 1998) was a Canadian ice hockey player who played 19 games in the National Hockey League for the Toronto Maple Leafs during the 1942–43 season. The rest of his career, which lasted from 1933 to 1950, was spent in various minor leagues. Internationally he played for the Canadian national team at the 1937 World Championships.

Career statistics

Regular season and playoffs

International

External links
 

1913 births
1998 deaths
Canadian expatriate ice hockey players in England
Canadian ice hockey right wingers
Cornwall Flyers players
Earls Court Rangers players
Ice hockey people from Saskatchewan
Kimberley Dynamiters players
People from Swift Current
Providence Reds players
Toronto Maple Leafs players
Tulsa Oilers (USHL) players